The Government of Chad has been ruled by Mahamat Déby since 20th April 2021.

Cabinet

See also
 Minister of Foreign Affairs (Chad)
 Minister of Finance and Budget (Chad)

References

Bibliography
US State Department
The Government of Chad